Mulzim may refer to:
 Mulzim (1988 film), a Hindi-language action film
 Mulzim (1963 film), a Hindi film